Delaware elected its members October 3, 1820.

See also 
 1820 and 1821 United States House of Representatives elections
 List of United States representatives from Delaware

1820
Delaware
United States House of Representatives